Calvin Murray Sinclair,  (born Mizanay (Mizhana) Gheezhik; January 24, 1951) is a former member of the Canadian Senate and First Nations lawyer who served as chairman of the Indian Residential Schools Truth and Reconciliation Commission from 2009 to 2015. He previously served as a judge in Manitoba from 1988 to 2009, being the first Indigenous judge appointed in the province. Sinclair was appointed to the Senate of Canada on April 2, 2016. In November 2020, he announced his retirement from the Senate effective January 31, 2021.

Queen's University announced the appointment of Sinclair as the 15th chancellor, succeeding Jim Leech. He assumed the role on July 1, 2021.

Early life
Calvin Murray Sinclair was born on January 24, 1951 and raised on the former St. Peter's Indian Reserve in the Selkirk area north of Winnipeg, Manitoba. His parents were Henry and Florence (née Mason) Sinclair. His siblings were Richard, Henry Jr. (Buddy) and Dianne. An older sister had died in infancy. Their mother, Florence, died in April 1952 following a stroke, and they were raised by their grandparents Jim and Catherine Sinclair in St. Peter's.

After graduating from high school (Selkirk Collegiate Institute) as class valedictorian and Athlete of the Year in 1968, Sinclair attended the University of Manitoba's School of Physical Education, but left before graduating to take care of his ailing grandmother after his grandfather died in 1970. He then worked at the Selkirk Friendship Centre as an administrator and youth worker and was elected vice president of the Manitoba Metis Federation for the Interlake Region in 1971. In 1972, he went to work for Howard Pawley Q.C., who was at that time the Member of the Legislative Assembly for Selkirk and the Attorney General of Manitoba, as his executive assistant.

In 1976, Sinclair continued his academic career at the University of Winnipeg, studying sociology and history. He then attended law school at the Faculty of Law at the University of Manitoba, and graduated in 1979, having won the A.J. Christie Prize awarded to the top student in litigation in his second year of legal studies.

Sinclair also spent his teenage years as an air cadet with #6 Jim Whitecross Royal Canadian Air Cadet Squadron, attaining the rank of warrant officer first class. As an air cadet he was awarded the Warren Spohn Trophy for outstanding leadership, after earning top marks at the Air Cadet Leadership Training Program in Camp Borden, Ontario. After cadets, he continued his involvement as an instructor with the squadron.

Legal career

He was called to the Manitoba Bar in 1980. During the course of his legal practice, Senator Sinclair practised primarily in the fields of Civil and Criminal Litigation Human Rights law, and Indigenous Law. He represented a cross-section of clients but was known for his representation of Aboriginal people and his knowledge of Aboriginal legal issues, having taught courses on Aboriginal People and the Law in the Department of Native Studies at the University of Manitoba since 1981. Senator Sinclair also served as legal counsel for the First Nations of Manitoba, representing them in the areas of land claims, legislative initiatives, funding negotiations and the negotiation of Child Welfare Agreements following the release of the Kimelman Report into Child Welfare in Manitoba. Senator Sinclair has acted as legal counsel for the Manitoba Human Rights Commission. He has also been an adjunct professor of law and an adjunct professor in the Faculty of Graduate Studies at the University of Manitoba.

Senator Sinclair was appointed as associate chief judge of the Provincial Court of Manitoba in March 1988, becoming the first Aboriginal judge in the province.

As associate chief judge, Senator Sinclair was appointed co-commissioner, along with Court of Queen's Bench Associate Chief Justice A. C. Hamilton, of Manitoba's Public Inquiry into the Administration of Justice and Aboriginal People (The Aboriginal Justice Inquiry). The AJI report was an extensive study of issues plaguing the relationship between Aboriginal people in Manitoba and the justice system and has had a significant impact on law and legal policy in Canada. It was referred to in the Report of the Royal Commission on Aboriginal Peoples of Canada (RCAP) as well as by the Canadian Bar Association in its report on Aboriginal People and the law of Canada.

In November 2000, Senator Sinclair completed the "Report of the Pediatric Cardiac Surgery Inquest," a study into the deaths of twelve children in the pediatric cardiac surgery program of the HSC (Winnipeg Health Sciences Centre) in 1994. That report led to significant changes in pediatric cardiac surgery in Manitoba and the study of medical and systemic errors in Canada.

He was appointed to the Court of Queen's Bench of Manitoba in January 2001 and is the province's first Aboriginal person to be appointed a judge on that court. While a judge of that court, Justice Sinclair was asked to chair Canada's Truth and Reconciliation Commission (TRC), a request he initially declined due to the expected emotional toll. However, when the initial chair of the TRC resigned and the other commissioners were replaced, Senator Sinclair was asked, and agreed, to reconsider. In 2009, he was appointed as its chair, on the condition that the decision-making process switched from voting to consensus

After the TRC completed its final report in 2015, Senator Sinclair announced his retirement from the bench and his intention to withdraw from public life. However he was asked by leaders of Manitoba's Indigenous community to allow them to nominate him for an appointment to Canada's Senate, and with the support of his family, he agreed. He was appointed as a senator from Manitoba in April 2016. Since being appointed to the Senate, Senator Sinclair has helped form the Independent Senators Group and has sat on the Senate Standing Committees on Aboriginal/Indigenous Peoples, Fisheries and Oceans, Legal and Constitutional issues, Rules, Ethics and Conflicts of Interest.

He has also acted as a mediator, makes numerous public appearances on matters relating to Indigenous issues and the Senate of Canada, and was asked to investigate the role of the Police Services Board of Thunder Bay, Ontario, in the light of allegations of systemic racism in policing in that community. That report was completed in October 2018.

Sinclair retired from the Senate in 2021.

As of 2022, Sinclair worked as a lawyer at Winnipeg law firm Cochrane Saxberg.

Truth and Reconciliation Commission

Senator Sinclair was appointed the chair of Canada's Indian Residential Schools Truth and Reconciliation Commission in June 2009. The commission's mandate stemmed from the terms of the Indian Residential Schools Settlement Agreement as a means by which Residential School Survivors and former staff could inform all Canadians about what happened in Indian Residential Schools and document the accounts of survivors, former staff, families, communities and anyone personally affected by the Indian Residential Schools experience.

The TRC held hundreds of public and private hearings throughout Canada and documented over 6,000 statements of Survivors and more than 200 from former staff, all of which led to the commission's massive multi-volume Final Report released on December 15, 2015. The Report documented the history of residential schools in Canada, noting that the Government of Canada had legally mandated the forcible removal of children from their families and communities to remove them from the cultural influence of their parents, families and communities. The schools were established to force Indigenous children to stop speaking their unique languages or following their unique cultural beliefs and practices and to adopt Euro-Canadian cultures and languages. This major finding of the Report – that Canada established and maintained its forcible removal and Residential School policy for the primary purpose of eliminating Aboriginal cultures and racial identity – led to its conclusion that Canada had committed cultural genocide.

The report also noted that the Government refused to include in the Settlement Agreement, those schools to which Indigenous children were sent by direction of the government, but which were managed by the church or other organizations, as well as schools that had been established in Newfoundland and Labrador before it entered into Confederation in 1949. The Report called upon Canada to address that issue quickly and collaboratively.

The report contained 94 Calls to Action and called upon all parts of Canadian Society to commit to reconciliation and to build a more respectful relationship between Aboriginal and non-Aboriginal people. Senator Sinclair told everyone very clearly “Reconciliation is not an Indigenous problem. It is a Canadian one.”

In his final speech at the final event, Senator Sinclair acknowledged that reconciliation was going to be difficult, perhaps more difficult than getting at the truth behind Residential Schools, but it had to be done. He addressed all of Canada when he stated: “We have described for you a mountain. We have shown you the way to the top. We call upon you to do the climbing.”

Personal life

He is a Fourth Degree Midewiwin member of the Three Fires Society, a traditional Ojibway medicine society of great significance to the Ojibway people.

Sinclair's traditional Ojibway name is Mizanay Gheezhik, meaning "the One Who Speaks of Pictures in the Sky”. He was named by Traditional Ojibway Teacher and Elder Onobinisay (Jim Dumont).

Sinclair has two children from his first marriage to Jeanette Warren. He is married to Katherine Morrisseau-Sinclair and they have a daughter. Additionally, the Sinclair family has adopted two daughters into the family.

Civic life
Sinclair has served on numerous community boards including The Jemima Centre for the Handicapped, Scouts Canada, The John Howard Society, The Royal Canadian Air Cadets, The Canadian Club, The Canadian Native Law Students Association, The Canadian Indian Lawyers Association (now the Indigenous Bar Association), The Social Planning Council of Winnipeg, the Ma Mawi Wi Chi Itata Centre, AbinochiZhawaynDakooziwin Ojibway Immersion Nursery School Board, the Selkirk Friendship Centre, the Manitoba Provincial Judges Association, the Manitoba Bar Association, the National Judicial Institute and the board of regents of the University of Winnipeg.

Awards
In 2016, Murray Sinclair was honoured with a 'Peace Patron Award' by The Mosaic Institute, an NGO based in Toronto working to promote pluralism reducing conflict in Canada and abroad.
Sinclair was awarded the A. J. Christie Prize in Civil Litigation in his second year of law, and articled with a law firm in his home town.
He was awarded a National Aboriginal Achievement Award, now the Indspire Awards, in the field of Justice in 1994, and for Lifetime Achievement in 2017.
He has received 20 honorary degrees for his work in the field of Aboriginal justice.
Other awards and honours include the Mahatma Gandhi Prize for Peace from the Gandhi Foundation, Canada's World Peace Award (2016) from the World Federalist Movement-Canada, the Mandela Award, the Tarnopolski Award for Human Rights from the International Federation of Jurists (2017) and the Meritorious Service Cross for his service on the Truth and Reconciliation Commission of Canada and the Order of Canada in 2022

References

External links

1951 births
Canadian senators from Manitoba
First Nations lawyers
First Nations politicians
Independent Canadian senators
Indspire Awards
Judges in Manitoba
Living people
Ojibwe people
Robson Hall alumni
University of Manitoba alumni
21st-century Canadian politicians
Independent Senators Group
20th-century Canadian lawyers
20th-century Canadian judges
21st-century Canadian judges
First Nations judges
Companions of the Order of Canada
People from Winnipeg Capital Region